The Reverend James Boyer (1736–1814) was the tyrannical headmaster of Christ's Hospital from the years 1778 to 1799.

Reputation
These years at the end of the 18th century were when three of the school's most famous students attended: Leigh Hunt, Charles Lamb, and Samuel Taylor Coleridge. Boyer's personality was immortalized in the writing of all three authors. Hunt made several references to Boyer in his autobiography, Lamb wrote of him in his two essays concerning his time at Christ's Hospital, and Coleridge referred to him in his Biographia Literaria. Through the work of these three authors in particular Boyer gained a reputation for capricious and unpredictable brutality. Most famously, Boyer knocked one of Hunt's teeth out by throwing a heavy copy of Homer at his head from across the room.

Lamb wrote this about the arbitrary violence of Boyer:

The arbitrary nature of Boyer's tyranny is illustrated in a story Hunt tells of a boy referred to simply as C__ with whom the master took “every opportunity to be severe with him, nobody knew why.

Boyer is also credited with much of the achievement of the students at the school. Coleridge, in particular, praised Boyer's influence concerning his approach to poetics.

According to Hunt, when Coleridge learned that Boyer was on his death-bed, he said “it was lucky that the cherubim who took him to heaven were nothing but faces and wings, or he would infallibly have flogged them by the way.”

Sources
 Autobiography by Leigh Hunt, 2 volumes, E.P. Dutton & Company, New York, 1903.
 Biogrphia Literaria by Samuel Coleridge, Harper and Brothers, New York, 1884
 Everybody's Lamb by Charles Lamb, (A.C. Ward [ed.])G. Bell & Sons, London, 1933.

Headmasters of Christ's Hospital
1736 births
1814 deaths